The stiff-arm fend (also known as a hand off or fend off in rugby league and rugby union, sometimes as a don't argue in Australian rules football, or a stiff arm or straight arm in American football) is a tactic employed by the ball-carrier in many forms of contact football.

The skill
In rugby league, rugby union, American football and Australian football, ball-carriers run towards defenders who are attempting to tackle them. By positioning the ball securely in one arm, the ball-carrier can fully extend their other arm, locking their elbow, and outstretching their palm. Then, the ball-carrier pushes directly outwards with the palm of their hand onto the chest or shoulder of the would-be tackler. The fend is a pushing action, rather than a striking action.

A stiff-arm fend may cause the tackler to fall to the ground, taking them out of the play. Even if the tackler keeps their feet, it becomes impossible for them to complete a tackle, as they cannot come close enough to wrap their arms around the ball-carrier.

A well-executed stiff-arm fend can be a very powerful offensive weapon.

The term don't argue was coined in Australia to describe the stiff-arm fend. The term describes what a commentator imagined the ball-carrier might be saying as they shoved their opponent in the face or chest, and is used as a noun. 
Ball-carriers in Australian football must be careful to avoid fending opponents in the head or neck, otherwise they will concede a high tackle free kick. High fends will generally be allowed in rugby unless the referee rules that the fend is too forceful, constituting a strike rather than a push.  In Rugby, a stiff-arm tackle (i.e. locked elbow and extended arm prior to making contact with the attacker) is dangerous play.  A player makes a stiff-arm tackle when using a stiff-arm to strike an opponent (Laws of the Game, Rugby Union, Law 10.4, dangerous Play and Misconduct, Section (e), dangerous tackling).  Therefore, a stiff-arm fend, as described above is permitted (even a high fend) so long as it does not constitute striking the opponent (similar to an open-handed punch).

The stiff arm is also known as "pie in the face" in NFL slang.

Physics
The stiff-arm fend is particularly effective because its force is applied down the length of a straight arm, directly into the shoulder. This puts the arm bones exclusively under compressive axial stress, the stress to which bone is strongest, and ensures that minimal torque is applied to the shoulder joint. As such, the force that can be applied by a stiff-arm fend can easily repel or topple an oncoming defender. The same techniques are practised by some schools of martial artists when striking or punching; by ensuring that the direction of the force is directly down a locked, straight arm, martial artists can punch through bricks and tiles without damaging their arms.

By Code

Gridiron Football
Stiff arms are most often performed by running backs.  Some notable players to use the stiff arm are Walter Payton, Derrick Henry and Adrian Peterson.

Australian Football
See also: 

High contact in a don't argue in Australian Football can result in a free kick against the player in possession so the Australian Football fend requires additional precision to avoid contact to the face or neck, though in practice such incidental contact is not always penalised. Players typically push off the shoulder or chest of the opponent. There is no statistic for stiff-arm fends in Australian Rules, however they are counted as broken tackles and are most commonly performed by mid-fielders and forwards. Use of forearms and elbows can be dangerous and are usually penalised. 

One of the first players noted to do this regularly in matches from the 1877 VFA season was superstar George Coulthard. 

Some of the best modern exponents of the don't argue include Dustin Martin, Sam Powell-Pepper, Lance Franklin, Barry Hall, Fraser Gehrig, Michael Conlon, Jason Johnson, Nathan Jones, Ben Cunnington and Gary Ablett Jnr.

Rugby Football
Some famous players who use the fend include dual rugby/league international Sonny Bill Williams.

References

External links

 Classic Sports Moves: The Stiff Arm - slideshow by Life magazine

Australian rules football terminology
American football terminology
Rugby league terminology
Laws of Australian rules football
Australian rules football tactics